Rockne is an unincorporated community in Bastrop County, Texas, United States. According to the Handbook of Texas, the community had a population of 400 in 2000. It is located within the Greater Austin metropolitan area.

History
Rockne started with German settlers, such as the Lehman family, sometime before 1846. The first church included another community called Meuth, but was eventually separated. Seven families began to worship in the community. The first service was held at Phillip Goertz's home in 1876 and a church was built in the area after the land was donated by him and his wife, Catherine, alongside Michael and Rebecca Wolf. It then burned in 1891. It was here that the community was established. Its first name was Walnut Creek, then Lehman or Lehmanville. A post office was established at Lehman in 1900 and remained in operation until 1903. It was renamed Hilbigville for businessman W.M. Hilbig, who started his business there in 1922. It was named after Knute Rockne. In 1931, a vote was taken, with the children electing to name the town after Rockne, who had died in a plane crash earlier that year. The community profited from agriculture and raising cattle in nearby oilfields. A third Catholic church was established in the community in 1940, on the same land that the second church sat on. The community's population ranged from 150 to 280 residents in the 1940s but eventually stabilized at 150 by 1950. The community's church was renovated in 1976, and its population grew to 400, remaining there through 2000. On March 10, 1988, Rockne opened its post office for one day, during which a Knute Rockne twenty-two-cent commemorative stamp was issued. A life-size bust of Rockne was unveiled on March 4, 2006, and sits in front of the Rockne Museum.

The Lower Colorado River Authority buys natural gas on the open market and stores it at the Hilbig Gas Storage Facility, an underground reservoir near Rockne. The facility can hold up to 4 billion cubic feet of natural gas.

Geography

Education
A school called St. Elizabeth's school opened in 1900 and was changed to Sacred Heart. Its students participated in naming the community in 1931. Rockne is served by the Bastrop Independent School District. Students in the Red Rock area attend Red Rock Elementary School, Cedar Creek Intermediate School, Cedar Creek Middle School, and Cedar Creek High School.

References

Unincorporated communities in Bastrop County, Texas
Unincorporated communities in Texas